Gzovsky (feminine: Gzovskaya) is a Russian-language form of the Polish surname Gzowski. In emigration, the surname may also be transliterated as Gsovsky, Gsovski.

The surname may refer to:

Olga Gzovskaya
Tatjana Gsovsky
Victor Gsovsky

Russian-language surnames